5855 Yukitsuna, provisional designation , is a stony Marian asteroid from the central regions of the asteroid belt, approximately  in diameter. It was discovered on 26 October 1992, by Japanese astronomers Akira Natori and Takeshi Urata at the JCPM Yakiimo Station. The likely elongated S-type asteroid has a rotation period of 19 hours.

Orbit and classification 

Yukitsuna is a core member of the Maria family, a large intermediate belt family of stony asteroids. Alternatively, it has also been assigned to the stony Eunomia family, one of the most prominent families in the intermediate main belt with more than 5,000 members.

It orbits the Sun in the central main-belt at a distance of 2.2–2.9 AU once every 4 years and 1 month (1,489 days; semi-major axis of 2.55 AU). Its orbit has an eccentricity of 0.16 and an inclination of 16° with respect to the ecliptic.

Physical characteristics 

Yukitsuna is an assumed S-type asteroid, as is the overall spectral type of both the Maria and Eunomia family.

Rotation period 

In January 2006, a rotational lightcurve of Yukitsuna was obtained from photometric observations by Federico Manzini at the Sozzago Astronomical Station  in Italy. Lightcurve analysis gave a rotation period of 19.2 hours with a brightness variation of 0.8 magnitude. In September 2008, a more refined period of 19.04 hours and an amplitude of 0.80 magnitude was measured at the Oakley Southern Sky Observatory and Oakley Observatory. The high brightness variation of 0.8 magnitude is indicative for an elongated, non-spherical shape.

Diameter and albedo 

According to the survey carried out by the NEOWISE mission of NASA's Wide-field Infrared Survey Explorer, Yukitsuna measures between 10.585 and 11.100 kilometers in diameter and its surface has an albedo between 0.273 and 0.3002.

The Collaborative Asteroid Lightcurve Link assumes an albedo of 0.21 – derived from 15 Eunomia, the parent body of the Eunomia family – and calculates a diameter of 11.03 kilometers based on an absolute magnitude of 12.1.

Naming 

This minor planet was named after , a general of the late Heian period of Japanese history. The official naming citation was published by the Minor Planet Center on 14 December 1997.

References

External links 
 A History of the Japanese People From the Earliest Times to the End of the Meiji Era, google books
 Asteroid Lightcurve Database (LCDB), query form (info )
 Dictionary of Minor Planet Names, Google books
 Asteroids and comets rotation curves, CdR – Observatoire de Genève, Raoul Behrend
 Discovery Circumstances: Numbered Minor Planets (5001)-(10000) – Minor Planet Center
 
 

005855
Discoveries by Akira Natori
Discoveries by Takeshi Urata
Named minor planets
19921026